The High Point Panthers women's volleyball team is an NCAA Division I volleyball team representing High Point University as part of the Big South Conference. They play their home games at Millis Athletic Convocation Center in High Point, North Carolina.

History

High Point University created a volleyball team in 1973, with the Panthers joining the present-day Conference Carolinas, where they played until the 1997 academic year. The Panthers competed only in the NAIA until 1992, had dual membership with the NAIA and Division II in 1993–1994, and moved up to exclusively Division II in 1995. The program had a spate of successful seasons from 1975 to 1980, winning six straight conference titles and peaking with 42 wins in back-to-back years in 1977–1978. However, the NAIA did not begin sponsoring women's volleyball championships until 1980, and the AIAW did not invite them to its volleyball championship. High Point made the NAIA tournament four times: 1982, 1983, 1986, and 1988. The NAIA volleyball championship has a round-robin format, and the Panthers went 2–12 in their four appearances in the 1980s. In Division II, the Panthers won back-to-back conference championships in the Carolinas-Virginia Athletics Conference in 1995–1996. However, this did not result in any NCAA tournament appearances as the league was a fledgling member of Division II.

The High Point Panthers moved up to Division I and joined the Big South Conference in 1999, and the volleyball team encountered struggles in its first few seasons, losing 27+ games each year from 1999 to 2003. However, head coach Chad Esposito was able to build the program up to 24 wins in 2007 and 26 wins in 2008, winning the team's only shared regular-season championship to date in 2008. The Panthers fell 3–2 to Coastal Carolina in the Big South tournament semifinals that year.

The Panthers were coached by Jason Oliver from 2009 to 2015, and his tenure was highlighted by a conference tournament championship in 2010, where they swept top-seeded Liberty in the final. The Panthers drew No. 12 Duke in the first round, and lost 25–12, 25–20, 25–20.

Current head coach Tom Mendoza was hired in 2016, bringing a history of success with him. Mendoza had previously coached at Creighton, leading the Blue Jays to a 142–57 record in six seasons from 2010 to 2015, five NCAA Tournament bids, and a Sweet 16 appearance in 2015. In his first season at High Point, Mendoza guided the Panthers to a 23–10 record and the program's second Big South conference tournament title, a 3–1 triumph against top-seeded Radford. The Panthers faced No. 7 North Carolina in the NCAA tournament, falling 25–13, 25–12, 25–23. 2017 was the team's most successful in the Division I era in terms of RPI, as the team reached as high as 44 by the end of the season. After a 5–6 start to the season, including four losses to top-50 RPI teams, the Panthers won 19 straight matches, becoming the first team in Big South history to go 16–0 in conference, while only conceding 4 sets in conference play. The Panthers handed their rivals Radford two of the Highlanders' four losses in the regular season, but in the conference tournament championship, held at Radford, the Highlanders avenged the regular season losses and the previous championship in a 3–1 victory. However, the Panthers were surprisingly picked as an at-large bid for the NCAA Tournament due to their final RPI of 39. They traveled to Salt Lake City to take on Purdue. The Panthers won the first set 25-21 before dropping the next three to finish the season 24–8.

Individual awards
Big South Rookie of the Year
 Tracyann Pryce - 1999
 Lindsey Pickens - 2003
 Savannah Angel - 2013
 Molly Livingston - 2015
 Abby Bottomley - 2017
Big South Coach of the Year
 Chad Esposito - 2008
 Tom Mendoza - 2017
Big South Tournament MVP
 Audie Gonzalez - 2010
 Haley Barnes - 2016
Big South Scholar-Athlete of the Year
 Molly Barlow - 2012
 Gabi Mirand - 2015
 Haley Barnes - 2017

Individual career records (Division I era)

Individual single-season records (Division I era)

Seasons

Postseason Results
The Panthers have appeared in 3 NCAA tournaments and 4 NAIA tournaments. Their all-time record is 2–15.

NAIA tournament results

NCAA tournament results

References

College women's volleyball teams in the United States
Volleyball, Women's
Volleyball clubs established in 1973
1973 establishments in North Carolina
Women's sports in North Carolina